Bagun Sumbrui (24 February 1924 – 22 June 2018) was an Indian politician and a former member of the 14th Lok Sabha. He represented the Singhbhum constituency of Jharkhand, and was a member of the Indian National Congress (INC) political party.

Profile
Position Held 
 
1967–69 
Member, Bihar Legislative Assembly 
 
1967–68 
Member, Public Accounts Committee, Bihar Legislative Assembly
Member, Bihar Legislative Assembly (2nd term) 
 
1969–72 
Minister, Forests Production, Transport, Welfare and Sports, Government of Bihar 
 
1972–77
Member, Bihar Legislative Assembly (3rd term), Member, S.T., S.C. and B.C. Welfare Committee 
 
1977–79
Re-elected to 6th Lok Sabha 
 
1980-84
Re-elected to 7th Lok Sabha (2nd term) 
 
1989–91
Elected to 9th Lok Sabha (4th term) 
 
1990
Member, Committee on Papers Laid on the Table 
 
1984–89
Re-elected to 8th Lok Sabha (3rd term) 
 
2000
Member, Committee on the Welfare of Scheduled Castes and Scheduled Tribes 
Member, Bihar & Jharkhand Legislative Assembly (4th term)
Member, Consultative Committee, Ministry of Labour and Welfare 
Cabinet Minister for Tribal Welfare, Government of Bihar 
 
2002–04 Member, Jharkhan Legislative Assembly 
Deputy Speaker, Jharkhand Legislative Assembly 
Member, Committee on Rural Development
Member, Committee on Papers Laid on the Table 
 
2004
Re-elected to 14th Lok Sabha (5th term) 
Member, Committee on Public Undertakings 
Acting Speaker, Jharkhand Legislative Assembly 
Member, Committee on Coal

Other information
President, All India Jharkhand Party 1968–79; Member, (i) Working Committee, Janata Party, Bihar, 1979-March 1980; and (ii) Working Committee, Bharatiya Janata Party, Bihar

Sumbrai died on 22 June 2018 at the age of 94 in Jamshedpur.

References

External links
 Home Page on the Parliament of India's Website

1924 births
2018 deaths
Indian National Congress politicians
People from West Singhbhum district
India MPs 2004–2009
India MPs 1977–1979
India MPs 1980–1984
India MPs 1984–1989
India MPs 1989–1991
Lok Sabha members from Jharkhand
Members of the Jharkhand Legislative Assembly
Janata Party politicians